The Vengeur-class ships of the line were a class of forty 74-gun third rates, designed for the Royal Navy as a joint effort between the two Surveyors of the Navy at the time (Sir William Rule and Henry Peake). The Vengeur Class, sometimes referred to as the Surveyors' class of third rates, amongst other names, was the most numerous class of ships of the line ever built for the Royal Navy - forty ships being completed to this design. Due to some dubious practices, primarily in the commercial dockyards used for construction, this class of ships earned itself the nickname of 'Forty Thieves.'

Between 1826 and 1832, ten of these ships were cut down by one deck (raséed) to produce 50-gun "frigates". These were the Barham, Dublin, Alfred, Cornwall, America, Conquestador, Rodney (renamed Greenwich), Vindictive, Eagle and Gloucester. Planned similar conversions of the Clarence (renamed Centurion) and Cressy around this time were cancelled, but the Warspite was additionally converted along the same lines in 1837–1840.

Around 1845 four of these ships were converted into 'blockships', the then-current term for floating batteries, equipped with a steam/screw propulsion system and re-armed with 60 guns. In this guise some of them saw action during the Crimean War. The four were the Blenheim, Ajax, La Hogue and Edinburgh. About ten years later, a further batch of five ships was similarly converted - this included the Russell, Cornwallis and Pembroke of this class (as well as the Hawke and Hastings of other designs).

Ships
The first ship - Vindictive - had been ordered at the start of 1806 at Portsmouth but no work had taken place until 1808. The two Surveyors produced their joint design which was approved on 1 October 1806, when three ships were ordered to this design, and a further four followed later in the same month. Another three orders were placed before the close of the year, but two of these ships (Akbar and Augusta) were cancelled in 1809.

Orders for another eighteen ships to this design were placed during 1807 (including nine of 13 July) and another six during the first half of 1808, almost all to be built by commercial contractors, to bring the total orders to thirty-five. Two of the 1806 orders were cancelled during 1809, but a further three ships were ordered from the Royal Dockyards in 1809 - 1811, and a final four on 6 January 1812, although the last of these - Boscawen - was never completed to this design. 

Two more ordered during late 1806 - HMS Akbar begun at Prince of Wales Island, Malaya and HMS Augusta at Portsmouth - were cancelled in 1809, while another two projected in 1807 - HMS Julius planned to be built at Chatham and HMS Orford at Rio de Janeiro - were never ordered.

 (ordered on 3 September 1812) was also built to this design in Bombay, using the moulds of Cornwallis after the Navy Board's set of plans sent for the construction of Wellesley were lost en route to India. It was always officially classified as a Black Prince-class ship of the line however, in accordance with the order placed in 1812.

In fiction
A fictitious member of this class of 74s, HMS Worcester, features largely in The Ionian Mission, one of the Aubrey-Maturin series of novels by Patrick O'Brian.

References
 Lavery, Brian (2003) The Ship of the Line - Volume 1: The development of the battlefleet 1650-1850. Conway Maritime Press. .
 Winfield, Rif (2008) British Warships in the Age of Sail. 1793 - 1817. Seaforth Publishing. .

 
Ship of the line classes